Haft Sanduq (also Romanized as Haft Şandūq and Khaft-Sanduk) is a village in Dodangeh-ye Olya Rural District, Ziaabad District, Takestan County, Qazvin Province, Iran. At the 2006 census, its population was 44, in 11 families.

References 

Populated places in Takestan County